Choy Mow Thim (born 29 May 1947) is a Malaysian former cyclist. He competed in the team time trial and the team pursuit events at the 1964 Summer Olympics.

References

External links
 

1947 births
Living people
Malaysian male cyclists
Olympic cyclists of Malaysia
Cyclists at the 1964 Summer Olympics
Place of birth missing (living people)
Cyclists at the 1966 Asian Games
Asian Games competitors for Malaysia
20th-century Malaysian people
21st-century Malaysian people